Constance Louisa Maynard (9 February 1849 – 26 March 1935) was the first principal of Westfield College (1882–1913) and a pioneer of women's education. She was the first woman to read Moral Sciences (philosophy) at the University of Cambridge.

Early life
Constance Maynard was born in 1849 in Highbury, Middlesex to an upper-middle-class family. She was one of four daughters and two sons of Henry Maynard (1800-1888) a South African merchant, and his wife Louisa née Hillyard (1806-1878). She grew up in Hawkhurst, Kent, in the house of Oakfield. Her two brothers attended boarding school, while she and her sisters were educated at home by governesses, except for one year at Belstead School in Suffolk. When their education was considered complete, she and her sisters cared for her invalid mother and did charitable work. Studies of Maynards autobiography reveal that she suppressed her carnal desires to "achieve salvation."

Education and career

In 1872 at the age of 23, Constance Maynard enrolled at Hitchin College for women which was affiliated with the University of Cambridge and was to become Girton College in 1873. She was the first woman to study the Moral Sciences tripos and in 1875 received the equivalent of a second class honours degree.

After leaving Girton, due to a temporary crisis in the family business, Constance Maynard was allowed to accept an invitation from Assistant Mistress Frances Dove to join the staff of Cheltenham Ladies' College. In 1877 she left with her colleague and friend Louisa Lumsden to establish St Leonard's School, at St Andrews, where Lumsden was head. During her three years (1877-1880) here, she rejected offers of headships, including that of her former school Belstead. She also refused a marriage proposal from Scottish Minister Dr James Robertson.

In 1880 she moved to London with her brother and studied part-time at the Slade School of Fine Art. Whilst studying there she became involved with a group of individuals including Major Charles Hamilton Malan, Ann Dudin Brown and Caroline Cavendish, with the shared aim of establishing a ladies' college. Constance Maynard was an integral part of forming the plans for her ideal college - to prepare ladies for the London degree, based on Christian principles. The group first met for discussions in February 1882, and in May Constance Maynard was offered the position of Mistress (a title borrowed from Girton). The rapid progress was possible because the Petrie family had introduced Ann Dudin Brown who funded the college's foundation.← In October 1882 Westfield College opened in two private houses in Hampstead. It was one of the first higher education institutions for women in England and one of the first in which women could gain degrees.

Maynard's diaries show a struggle to articulate the terms with which to express the love she felt for her students, and some scholars have accused her of abusing her power in pursuing relationships with them. She had a passionate relationship with one student, the future missionary Margaret Brooke, and Brooke was heartbroken when the relationship ended.

Constance Maynard remained Mistress of Westfield for 33 years, retiring in 1913. She had taught around 500 students, and many were successful working in schools, colleges and for missionary organisations. She kept in close contact with her old students through letters and visits, and maintained strong relationships with them. The money they collected as a parting gift she donated to the college; some was used as a hardship fund, the remainder as endowment for the Maynard divinity lectures (from 1915, later the Maynard-Chapman Divinity Lectures). In 1888 Maynard adopted a child through a friend in the Salvation Army. At the time of her adoption Stephanë Anthon, known as Effie, was eight years old, and the relationship between them was a difficult one. Whilst Constance continued to support Effie until her death in 1915, from tuberculosis, it is detailed in her diaries as a period of disappointment.

Religious movements such as the Salvation Army figured prominently in the life of Constance Maynard. She was elected as old students' representative to the governing body of Girton College and served from 1897 to about 1905 on the council of the Church Schools' Society. After her retirement, Constance Maynard spent her time travelling, receiving visitors, reading and writing. She wrote poetry, religious lectures and pamphlets of a moral or spiritual nature. She also edited collections of Dora Greenwell's poetry. Her unpublished writings including an unfinished autobiography have been digitised by the Archives at Queen Mary, University of London and are available to view online.

Constance Maynard died at her home in Gerrards Cross, Buckinghamshire, on 26 March 1935, and was buried at Gerrards Cross parish church on 29 March. Westfield college received £1500 in her will to fund an entrance scholarship.

Publications

 Between College Terms, 1910
 The Religious Training of Immaturity, National Sunday School Union, 1923
 The Kingdom of Heaven is like..., RTS, 1924
 We Women. A Golden Hope, Morgan and Scott, 1924 
 The Perfect Law of Liberty, RTS, 1925
 Dora Greenwell: a prophet for our own time on the battleground of our faith, 1926
 Progressive Creation, SPCK, 1927
 Then shall we Know, SPCK, 1927
 The Prophet Daniel and other essays, Morgan and Scott 1927

References

1849 births
1935 deaths
Alumni of Girton College, Cambridge
Heads of schools in England
People associated with Westfield College